Madrasa Nezam or Madrese-ye Nezām was a military academy located in Shah's Garden (now Hor Square), Tehran. The academy was founded by Maj. Gen. Mohammed Nakhchivan. Notable students include Mohammad Reza Pahlavi and Hossein Fardoust.

References

Military education and training in Iran
Defunct military academies